Kushwaha is a surname used by people of Koeri caste in Bihar. The Kushwahas are also known as Maurya, Shakya, Saini in various parts of north India.  As per one opinion, the Kushwaha surname is also common among members of Kachhi caste, who later merged with the Koeris to become a single homogeneous community.

Origin
By the early 1900, due to significant knowledge of agricultural practices, the agricultural communities like Koeri, Kachhi and Murao in the Gangetic Plain had amassed rural wealth and prosperity like the members of Kurmi and Yadav caste. This led them to lay claim on Kshatriya status. According to Herbert Hope Risley and William Wilson Hunter, these communities earlier had belief in Shakta and Shaiva faith, but the general claim on Kshatriya status made them link themselves to Solar Dynasty, via Kusha, one of the  son of Lord Rama. Thus the Surname "Kushwaha" was adopted to justify the newly gained wealth and prosperity. This trend became more visible with the passing of time and by 1990s these communities had gained education, more access to non farm jobs and acquired political power to become rising Kulaks in many of the north Indian states. They displaced upper castes from power in political sphere, in coalition with members of similar agricultural castes and started calling themselves as Kushwaha Kshatriya, a phenomenon described as Sanskritisation.

Notable people
Abhay Kushwaha, former Member of Bihar Legislative Assembly and President of Youth wing of Janata Dal (United).
Ajab Singh Kushwah,  Indian politician from Madhya Pradesh, a member of Indian National Congress
Amarjeet Kushwaha, Indian activist, lawyer and Member of Bihar Legislative Assembly (a member of  Communist Party of India (Marxist-Leninist) Liberation.)
Ashok Kushwaha, two times member of Bihar Legislative Assembly from Sasaram Assembly constituency.
Ajit Kushwaha, Indian Communist leader, Member of Bihar Legislative Assembly from Dumraon Assembly constituency.
Ankit Kushwah, Indian cricketer from Madhya Pradesh
Awadhesh Prasad Kushwaha, Indian politician from Bihar
Babu Singh Kushwaha, a former member of Bahujan Samaj Party and minister in Government of Uttar Pradesh. He, along with Swami Prasad Maurya and Nasimuddin Siddiqui, was considered as Mayawati's most trusted man.
Basant Kushwaha, former Member of Bihar Legislative Assembly, leader of Rashtriya Lok Samata Party.
Bhagvan Singh Kushwaha, Indian politician from UP
Binod Singh Kushwaha, former Minister for Backward and Extremely Backward Caste welfare in Government of Bihar, leader of Bhartiya Janata Party. 
Chandrapal Kushwaha, Indian politician from UP
Dinesh Prasad Kushwaha, former minister for irrigation in Government of Bihar.
Fateh Bahadur Kushwaha, Businessman and Member of Bihar Legislative Assembly from Dehri Assembly constituency (2020-25)
Ganga Singh Kushwaha, Indian politician from UP
Jagdeo Prasad Kushwaha, Indian politician from Bihar
Jagdish Singh Kushwaha, Indian politician from UP
Jayant Raj Kushwaha, former Minister for rural work department in Government of Bihar; Minister for minor water resources.
Kunwar Yashwantsingh Kushwah, Indian politician from Madhya Pradesh
Kushwaha Shashi Bhushan Mehta, Indian politician from Jharkhand
Kushwaha Shivpujan Mehta, Indian politician from Jharkhand
Manoj Singh Kushwaha, former Member of Bihar Legislative Assembly, a leader of Janata Dal (United).
Mahabali Singh Kushwaha, Member of Indian Parliament from Karakat Lok Sabha constituency, Janata Dal (United) leader.
Maha Nand Singh Kushwaha, activist and Member of Legislative Assembly from Arwal Assembly constituency.
Nagmani Kushwaha, Indian politician from Bihar and Jharkhand
Narayan Singh Kushwah, Indian politician, member of the Madhya Pradesh Legislative Assembly 2008–present
Narendra Kumar Kushwaha, Indian politician from UP
Neeraj Kushawaha, Indian politician from UP
Ramesh Kushwaha, Indian politician from Bihar
Ramratan Kushwaha, Indian politician from UP
Ravindra Kushawaha, Indian politician from UP
Ram Balak Singh Kushwaha, former Member of Bihar Legislative Assembly from Bibhutipur Assembly constituency.
Ramsewak Singh Kushwaha, former Member of Bihar Legislative Assembly from Hathua Assembly constituency.
Rajesh Singh Kushwaha, Member of Bihar Legislative Assembly from Hathua Assembly constituency (2020-25).
Dr. Rajesh Kushwaha; Former Member of Bihar Legislative Assembly from Kesaria Assembly constituency.
Renu Kushawaha, Indian politician from Bihar
R. S. Kushwaha, former Member of Uttar Pradesh Legislative Assembly (has been associated with Samajwadi Party and Bahujan Samaj Party).
Saket Kushwaha, Indian educationist and agricultural economist(Vice Chancellor of Rajiv Gandhi University, Arunachal Pradesh)
Santosh Kumar Kushwaha, Indian politician from Bihar
Salona Kushwaha, member of Uttar Pradesh Legislative Assembly.
Satyendra Narayan Kushwaha, former Member of Legislative Council, Bihar.
Satyadev Kushwaha, former member of Bihar Legislative Assembly, Janata Dal (United) leader.
Suraj Nandan Kushwaha, former president of Rashtrawadi Kushwaha Parishad, an organisation affiliated to Bharatiya Janata Party.
Sunil Kumar Kushwaha, Member of Parliament from Valmiki Nagar Lok Sabha constituency.
Satish Prasad Singh Kushwaha, Former Chief Minister of Bihar
Seema Samridhi Kushwaha, Supreme Court advocate, known for Nirbhaya gang rape case 2012.
Sunil Kushwaha, former Member of Bihar Legislative Assembly from Sitamarhi Assembly constituency.
Shri Bhagwan Singh Kushwaha, Indian politician from Bihar
Surendra Kumar Kushwaha, Bhartiya Janata Party politician from Fazilnagar Assembly constituency, Uttar Pradesh.
Umesh Singh Kushwaha, Indian politician from Bihar
Upendra Kushwaha, Indian politician from Bihar
Vishal Kushwah (born 1990), Indian cricketer
Vyas Deo Prasad Kushwaha, former minister in Government of Bihar, former Member of Bihar Legislative Assembly from Siwan Assembly constituency.

See also
Mahto

References